The 1916–17 Ottawa Senators season was the Ottawa Hockey Club's 32nd season of play. This  was the 8th and final season of the National Hockey Association. Teams were to play two half-seasons of 10 games each, though this was disrupted. Ottawa won the second half and played off against first-half winner Montreal Canadiens for the NHA title, but lost.

Team business
The Ottawa club wanted to suspend play for the season due to the war, but was voted down.

Regular season

Suspending the Blueshirts
On February 10, 1917, the Blueshirts played their final game, losing 4–1 at home to Ottawa. The following day, a meeting of the NHA executive in Montreal was held to deal with the 228th Battalion leaving for overseas. Toronto proposed continuing with a five-team league, but the other owners instead voted to suspend Toronto's team. The players were dispersed by a drawing of names. The following day, President Robinson was quoted as stating that the players would return to the club after the season, but he would not guarantee that the club would be allowed to return to play, stating that would be decided at the NHA annual meeting.

Continuing the season
Ottawa, while not unhappy at the suspension of Toronto, nevertheless lost a game for the use of Cy Denneny in a game against the 228th, and saw the Wanderers and Quebec receive wins for games against the 228th. The club threatened to not play for the rest of the season. However, cooler heads prevailed and Ottawa went back to work.

Final standings

Results
First half

Second half

‡ Ottawa lost game on use of ineligible Cy Denneny.
† Wanderers given win for this game in revised second half.
* 228th was ordered overseas. Toronto club was suspended by league.

Scoring

Leading goaltenders

Playoffs

The Montreal Canadiens won the O'Brien Cup, but lost to the Seattle Metropolitans of the PCHA in the Stanley Cup Finals.

Awards and records
 Frank Nighbor – shared scoring title with Joe Malone with 41 goals

See also
1916–17 NHA season

References
 

Ottawa Senators (original) seasons
Ottawa
Ottawa